Bovirdeh Salamat (also Romanized as Bovīrdeh Salāmat; also known as Bard-i-Salāmat, Bovair Deh, Boveyr Deh-e Salāmāt, Boveyr Deh Salāmat, Salāmat, and Salāmāt Boveyrdeh) is a village in Veys Rural District, Veys District, Bavi County, Khuzestan Province, Iran. At the 2006 census, its population was 221, in 35 families.

References 

Populated places in Bavi County